The cardinal shiner (Luxilus cardinalis) is a freshwater ray-finned fish in the family Cyprinidae, the carps and minnows. It occurs from the Arkansas River drainage in southwestern Missouri, northwestern Arkansas, eastern Kansas and eastern Oklahoma to the Red River drainage in southeastern Oklahoma, where it was probably introduced. Its preferred habitat is rocky and sandy pools and runs of headwaters, creeks and small rivers.

References

Luxilus
Freshwater fish of the United States
Fish described in 1988